KYRK may refer to:

KYRK, licensed to Taft, Texas
KVDU, in the New Orleans area (formerly KYRK)
KXPT, in Las Vegas (formerly KYRK)
KNMJ, serving Eunice, New Mexico (formerly KYRK)